Heat is an upcoming action-thriller television series created by Jason Herbison and directed by Kate Kendall. It will air on Channel 5 in the UK and on Network 10 in Australia. The plot focuses on two families as they take a joint vacation amidst the bushfire season. Heat stars Danny Dyer, Darren McMullen, Pia Miranda, and Jane Allsop. It was filmed in Melbourne and rural Victoria in November and December 2022.

Plot
Amidst the Australian bushfire season, Steve (Dyer) and Brad's (Fisher) families meet up for their annual vacation in the Victorian highlands, where secrets and lies are revealed.

Cast
 Danny Dyer as Steve Cameron
 Darren McMullen as Brad Fisher
 Pia Miranda as Sarah Cameron
 Jane Allsop as Louise Fisher
 Olympia Valance as Sergeant Angelos
 Richie Morris as Jet Calloway
 Matia Marks as Mia Cameron
 Matteo Annetta as Tom Cameron
 Hunter Hayden as Kip Fisher

Production
The series was commissioned along with Riptide, following the success of Lie With Me (2021). Both series were commissioned for Channel 5, and made by Fremantle Australia in partnership with Australia's Network Ten. Heat was created by Jason Herbison and produced by Natalie Mandel. The scripts have been written by Herbison, Margaret Wilson, and Anthony Ellis. Herbison stated: "I'm excited to partner with 10 and 5 once again for this tense family thriller, and ecstatic to have such an accomplished cast on board to bring it to life, along with Kate Kendall directing and Natalie Mandel driving the production." Commissioning editor at Channel 5 and Paramount+, Greg Barnett described the series as "a suspenseful and nail-biting thriller".

The cast was announced in November 2022. British actor Danny Dyer plays Steve Cameron, an ex-pat who moved to Australia with his best friend when they were young. Heat marks Dyer's first project since his departure from soap opera EastEnders. At the time of his casting, he stated: "Can't wait to get amongst this beautiful piece of work in Australia. I've always been intrigued about working there. It's my first gig since my long stint at EastEnders. Really powerful dark script and a strong Australian cast and crew. Let's have it!!!" Dyer flew out to Australian almost immediately after finishing up on EastEnders. He said that he had wanted to work in the sun, but the moment he arrived in Melbourne, it rained every day. Dyer was asked to put on an Australian accent for the role. He joked "They did ask me to be Australian but I said, 'Let's just calm down a little bit, let's not get carried away...'"  He described the script as "really clever" and he was proud to have been part of the show.

Scottish actor Darren McMullen plays Steve's best friend Brad Fisher, who emigrated to Australia with him. Pia Miranda is Steve's Australian wife Sarah Cameron, while Matteo Annetta plays their son Tom and Matia Marks plays their daughter Mia, who suspects her father of having an affair. Brad's wife Louise is played by Jane Allsop and Hunter Hayden is their son Kip. Other cast members include Olympia Valance as Sergeant Angelos and Richie Morris as Mia's boyfriend Jet Calloway.

Heat is directed by Kate Kendall. Production on the four-part series began in mid-November 2022, and concluded in early December. It was filmed on-location in Melbourne and rural Victoria. The production received funding from VicScreen. The first pictures from the series were released in February, followed by a teaser trailer on 1 March. Heat is expected to air in March 2023.

References

External links

2023 British television series debuts
2020s British drama television series
2023 Australian television series debuts
2020s Australian drama television series
Television shows set in Melbourne
Network 10 original programming
English-language television shows
Television episodes written by Jason Herbison
Television series by Fremantle (company)